Four Seasons is a mosaic by Marc Chagall that is located in Chase Tower Plaza in the Loop district of Chicago, Illinois. It was renovated in 1994 and a protective glass canopy was installed.

The mosaic was the subject of a 1974 documentary film, The Gift: Four Seasons Mosaic of Marc Chagall, directed by Chuck Olin.

See also
List of artworks by Marc Chagall
List of public art in Chicago

References

External links
The Four Seasons Smithsonian American Art Museum: Art Inventories Catalog
Smithsonian American Art Museum Save Outdoor Sculpture!
Marc Chagall’s Four Seasons in Chicago – His largest mosaic work

1974 sculptures
Mosaics
Public art in Chicago
Works by Marc Chagall
Birds in art
Fish in art